Colossus Bets is a British bookmaker specialising in pools betting. The Colossus Bets is headquartered inLondon, England, and was founded by former Monsanto PR operative Bernard Marantelli and Zeljko Ranogajec in 2012. The bookmaker currently focuses in modernize pools betting by incorporating modern betting features such as Cash Out and Syndicates, as well as offering lottery-sized jackpots.

History 
Colossus Bets was launched in the UK in 2013, initially providing solely football pools. They would go on to add horse racing, greyhound racing, American football, ice hockey, basketball and darts pools, making them the only multi-sport pools provider in the country.

In 2017 Colossus launched Syndicates, a group betting product that would allow its users to share the cost of their bets, and any potential winnings, with fellow players. The introduction of horse racing pools in July 2018 meant that, for the first time, the Tote were no longer the sole horse racing pools operator in the UK market. The Place 6 pool was introduced as a direct equivalent to the Placepot. In addition to offering their sports and racing pools on their website, the Colossus Bets pools have also been integrated into a number of partner websites across the world including; Bet365, Betway Africa, Dafabet, Matchbook, Racebets, Mr Green, Nairabet, Football Pools, eStave, and Paf.

Failed Partnership with British Racecourse Consortium 
In August 2017 Colossus Bets announced that they had entered into a partnership with 54 British racecourses in order to supply betting pools. However in May 2018 a number of newspaper articles were published revealing that Zeljko Ranogajec was the principal backer of the company using the alias of John Wilson. Subsequently, the consortium of 54 racecourses (Britbet) cancelled their arrangement with Colossus Bets in favour of The Tote.

Esports Technologies Inc Partnership
In May 2021 Esports Technologies Inc. (Nasdaq: EBET) announced an exclusive alliance with Colossus Bets . Under the terms of the agreement Colossus Bets became a shareholder in Esports Technologies Inc .

Conscious Colossus 
In 2020, Colossus Bets launched ‘Conscious Colossus’, a charitable initiative created to “target several areas of responsibility and covering a wide range of causes, including the advancement of sport within communities, responsible gambling education and animal welfare.” Conscious Colossus announced that they would be supporting three charities in their maiden year; Alive and Kicking, The Greyhound Trust and YGAM. In 2021 they announced an updated line up of Alive and Kicking, YGAM and Clime-It Brothers for their second year.

Dates of Significance 
2012 – Founded by Bernard Marantelli.

2013 – Colossus Bets launch in the UK with Michael Owen named as a brand ambassador.

2014 – Winner of the ‘Rising star’ award at the EGR Operator Awards.

2017 – Colossus Bets launch Syndicates product.

2017 – Colossus Bets announces partnership with consortium of British racecourses

2018 – Colossus Bets launch horse racing pools.

2018 – 54 British racecourses repudiate Colossus bets as their pools betting partner

2019 - North Dakota Racing Commission licenses Colossusbets as a service provider

2019 – Oregon Racing Commission grants Colossusbets a totalizator license

2019 – Colossus Bets launch greyhound racing pools.

2019 - Announces a long-term licensing agreement with Bet365 that will allow the operator access to its cash-out patent portfolio in the US.

2020 – Colossus Bets launch ice hockey and darts pools.

2020 – Winner of the ‘Best use of a brand ambassador’ award at the EGR Operator Marketing and Innovation Awards for their partnership with Fallon Sherrock.

2020 - Colossus Bets agreed a five-figure sponsorship deal with the Greyhound Grand National.

2020 – Bernard Marantelli is terminated as a director of the company.

2020 - David O'Reilly appointed as Chief Executive Officer

2021 - Bernard Marantelli devolves his bookmaking operations from Colossusbets to White Swan Data Limited. 

2021 - Esports betting and technology company Esports Technologies Inc concludes alliance agreement with Colossus Bets.

2021 - Colossus Bets sued DraftKings and Tabcorp over patent infringement.

References

External links 
 Official website

Bookmakers
Gambling companies of the United Kingdom
Companies based in London
Gambling in the United Kingdom